Mycena pura, commonly known as the lilac bonnet, is a species of mushroom in the family Mycenaceae. First called Agaricus prunus in 1794 by Christian Hendrik Persoon, it was assigned its current name in 1871 by German Paul Kummer. Mycena pura is known to bioaccumulate the element boron.

Description
The spores are white.

Similar species include Clitocybe nuda, Laccaria amethysteo-occidentalis, and Mycena purpureofusca.

Bioactive compounds
Mycena pura contains the chemical puraquinonic acid, a sesquiterpene. This compound induces mammalian cells (specifically, the cell line HL60) to differentiate into granulocyte- or macrophage-like cells. The fungus also contains the mycotoxin muscarine, and the antifungal metabolite strobilurin D, the latter previously found in Cyphellopsis anomala. Despite the presence of these toxins, some guides list M. pura as edible.

Gallery

See also
List of bioluminescent fungus species

References

Bioluminescent fungi
pura
Fungi of Europe
Taxa named by Christiaan Hendrik Persoon